Juan Luis Panero (9 September 1942 – 16 September 2013) was a Spanish poet, born in Madrid.

The son of Leopoldo Panero, nephew of Juan Panero and brother of Leopoldo María Panero, he was born into a well-off family, receiving his education in El Escorial and afterwards in London. His rebellious and wandering spirit drove him to travel around different countries in America, which gave him the opportunity to meet renowned writers such as Octavio Paz, Jorge Luis Borges and Juan Rulfo among others. He prepared anthologies of poets such as those of his father Leopoldo Panero, Pablo Neruda and Octavio Paz. He made selections of Colombian poetry (1880-1980) and contemporary Mexican poetry.

His poetic career started in 1968 with the publication of his book A través del tiempo (Through time), followed by Los trucos de la muerte (The tricks of death) in 1975, Desapariciones y fracasos (Disappearances and failures) in 1978 and Juegos para aplazar la muerte (Games to postpone death) in 1984. Antes que llegue la noche (Before night arrives) in 1985, won him the Premio Ciudad de Barcelona. In 1988 with Galerías y fantasmas (Galleries and ghosts), he won the Premio Internacional de Poesía de la Fundación Loewe. He lived in Girona from 1985 onwards.

In 1974, Jaime Chávarri began the shooting of what was supposed to be an illustrated report about the father Leopoldo Panero; the material turned into the film El desencanto (The Disenchantment) which ended up being a symbol of the family and of the age and may be considered a cult film for a whole generation. In the first half of El desencanto the mother, paradoxically called Felicidad (Happiness), and two of her sons describe the poet and their memories of him, though he does not appear in the film himself, no photograph, no video excerpt; he is the ghost that haunts this family. In the second half of the film, Leopoldo María Panero the son becomes the central axis of the story. But, within this special, unique and decadent family portrait is the image of an age that is coming to its end. The last parts of Spain's time under Franco can be seen through the evocation of old glory of the man who was one of Franco's official writers. El desencanto was also the last movie mutilated by cinematographic censorship in Spain and one of Chávarri's most critically acclaimed works. In 1994 Después de tantos años (After so many years) was released, a film in which Ricardo Franco takes up the task of the director that Jaime Chávarri undertook two decades before.

References

1942 births
2013 deaths
People from Madrid
Spanish male poets
20th-century Spanish poets
20th-century Spanish male writers